Walter Carl Becker (February 20, 1950 – September 3, 2017) was an American musician, songwriter, and record producer. He was the co-founder, guitarist, bassist, and co-songwriter of the jazz rock band Steely Dan.

Becker met future songwriting partner Donald Fagen while they were students at Bard College. After a brief period of activity in New York City, the two moved to Los Angeles in 1971 and formed the nucleus of Steely Dan, which enjoyed a critically and commercially successful ten-year career. Following the group's dissolution, Becker moved to Hawaii and reduced his musical activity, working primarily as a record producer. In 1985, he briefly became a member of the English band China Crisis, producing and playing synthesizer on their album Flaunt the Imperfection.

Becker and Fagen reformed Steely Dan in 1993 and remained active, recording Two Against Nature (2000), which won four Grammy Awards. Becker released two solo albums, 11 Tracks of Whack (1994) and Circus Money (2008). Following a brief battle with esophageal cancer, he died on September 3, 2017.

Early life and career (1950–1971)
Becker was born in Queens, New York City. After Becker's parents separated when he was a boy, his British mother returned to England. Becker was made to believe by his father and grandmother that his mother was deceased; however, sometime between his childhood and late adolescence, he discovered that she was living, and he maintained a rocky relationship with her from that point forward.<ref>J. L. Kelley (2021). "West of Hollywood: Humor as reparation in the life and work of Walter Becker." In: E. Vanderheiden & C.-H. Mayer (Eds.), [https://books.google.com/books?id=xo5DEAAAQBAJ&q=the+palgrave+handbook+of+humour+research The Palgrave Handbook of Humour Research] (pp. 363-379). London: Palgrave Macmillan</ref> He was raised in Queens and Scarsdale, New York by his father and his grandmother. His father, Carl Becker, sold paper-cutting machinery in Manhattan. He graduated from Manhattan's Stuyvesant High School. After starting out on saxophone, he switched to guitar and received instruction in blues technique from neighbor Randy California, who later formed the band Spirit.

Donald Fagen overheard Becker playing guitar at a campus café when they were both students at Bard College in Annandale-on-Hudson, New York. In an interview many years later, Fagen said, "I hear this guy practicing, and it sounded very professional and contemporary. It sounded like, you know, like a black person, really." They formed the band Leather Canary, which included fellow student Chevy Chase on drums. At the time, Chase called the group "a bad jazz band."

Becker left the school in 1969 before completing his degree and moved with Fagen to Brooklyn, where the two began to build a career as a songwriting duo. They were members of the touring band for Jay and the Americans but used pseudonyms. They also composed music for the soundtrack to You've Got to Walk It Like You Talk It or You'll Lose That Beat, a film starring Richard Pryor that was released in 1971.

With Steely Dan (1971–1981)

In 1971, Becker and Fagen moved to Los Angeles and were hired by Gary Katz as staff songwriters at ABC Records, later forming Steely Dan with guitarists Denny Dias and Jeff "Skunk" Baxter, drummer Jim Hodder, and vocalist David Palmer. Fagen played keyboards and sang, while Becker played bass guitar. Steely Dan spent the next three years touring and recording before swearing off touring in 1974, confining themselves to the studio with personnel that changed for every album. In addition to co-writing all of the band's material, Becker played guitar and bass guitar and sang background vocals.Pretzel Logic (1974) was the first Steely Dan album to feature Becker on guitar. "Once I met (session musician) Chuck Rainey", he explained, "I felt there really was no need for me to be bringing my bass guitar to the studio anymore".

Despite the success of Aja in 1977, Becker suffered from setbacks during this period, including an addiction to narcotics. After the duo returned to New York in 1978, Becker's girlfriend Karen Roberta Stanley, who was an employee of ABC Dunhill Records and personal manager for the band, died of a drug overdose in his apartment on January 30, 1980, resulting in a wrongful death lawsuit against him. Soon after, he was hit by a cab in Manhattan while crossing the street and was forced to walk with crutches while recovering. His exhaustion was made worse by commercial pressure and the complicated recording of the album Gaucho (1980). Becker and Fagen suspended their partnership in June 1981.

Work in record production (1981–1993)
Following Steely Dan's breakup, Becker and his family moved to Maui. Becker ceased using drugs, stopped smoking and drinking, and became an "avocado rancher and self-styled critic of the contemporary scene."

He produced albums for the new wave bands Fra Lippo Lippi and China Crisis, and is credited on the latter's 1985 album Flaunt the Imperfection as a member of the band. He also produced albums for Michael Franks and John Beasley. Becker produced Rickie Lee Jones's album Flying Cowboys and played bass on the main title track co-written by Pascal Nabet Meyer, which was certified gold by the RIAA in 1997. Becker and Fagen reunited in 1986 to collaborate on Zazu, the debut album by Rosie Vela. In 1991, Becker appeared in Fagen's New York Rock and Soul Revue.

Steely Dan reformation (1993–2017) 

In 1993, Becker produced Fagen's album Kamakiriad. A year later, Fagen co-produced Becker's debut album  11 Tracks of Whack.

Also in 1993, Steely Dan began touring for the first time in nineteen years, resulting in the 1995 release of their first live album, Alive in America, a compilation of live recordings from different American tour dates in 1993 and 1994.

In 2000 they released Two Against Nature, their first album of new material in twenty years. The album won four Grammy Awards, including Album of the Year. In 2001 they were inducted into the Rock and Roll Hall of Fame and received honorary doctorates from the Berklee College of Music, which they accepted in person. In 2003, they released the album Everything Must Go with Becker singing lead vocal on "Slang of Ages". They followed the album with a tour.

In 2005, Becker co-produced and played bass guitar on the album All One by Krishna Das and played guitar on the album Tough on Crime by Rebecca Pidgeon. He co-wrote "I'm All Right" from the album Half the Perfect World (2006) by Madeleine Peyroux, and "You Can't Do Me" and the title track from her album Bare Bones (2009). He was inducted into the Long Island Music Hall of Fame in 2008.

His second solo album, Circus Money, was released on June 10, 2008, fourteen years after its predecessor. The songs were inspired by reggae and other styles of Jamaican music.

 Instruments and equipment 
Becker was a collector of musical equipment, accumulating hundreds of guitars and amplifiers, as well as numerous other instruments, pedals, pre-wired pedalboards, "speakers, recording gear, and ephemera." In concert, he often played custom-built guitars modeled after Stratocasters.

Becker's guitar and amp collection was the largest ever sold by Julien's, whose owner said "what made [the] collection unique" was that Becker "literally played all of them."

In a column for Guitar Player magazine published in 1994, Becker coined the acronym G.A.S. ("Guitar Acquisition Syndrome"), denoting the uncontrolled accumulation of music gear. The term was later adapted as Gear Acquisition Syndrome in online forums and music magazines.

Personal life
In 1984 Becker married Elinor Roberta Meadows, a yoga teacher, and the couple had two children, including adopted daughter Sayan. They divorced in 1997. Becker wrote the song "Little Kawai" for his son, and it became the final song on the album 11 Tracks of Whack.

Becker was also married to Delia Cioffi and Juanna Fatouros.

Illness and death
In the spring of 2017, Becker was diagnosed with "an aggressive form of esophageal cancer" during an annual medical checkup. Despite undergoing vigorous treatment, the cancer rapidly worsened to the point that he was completely absent from all of Steely Dan's concerts in the months that followed. He died from the disease on September 3, 2017, at the age of 67, at his home in Manhattan, New York City. At the time of his death, no cause or other details were announced, but a statement released in November by Becker's widow, Delia Becker, detailed his struggle with the disease.

Musicians such as Julian Lennon, Steve Lukather, and John Darnielle of the Mountain Goats made public statements mourning Becker's death. Rickie Lee Jones, whose album Flying Cowboys was produced by Becker, recalled her long friendship with him in an editorial she wrote for Rolling Stone.

In a statement released to the media the day of Becker's death, Fagen recalled his long-time friend and musical partner as "smart as a whip, an excellent guitarist and a great songwriter," and closed by stating that he intended to "keep the music we created together alive as long as I can with the Steely Dan band."

Discography

Studio albums
 11 Tracks of Whack (1994)
 Circus Money (2008)

As sideman or producer
 1969 Alias Boona, Terence Boylan
 1974 First Grade, Thomas Jefferson Kaye
 1985 Flaunt the Imperfection, China Crisis
 1986 Zazu, Rosie Vela
 1987 Light and Shade, Fra Lippo Lippi
 1989 Diary of a Hollow Horse, China Crisis
 1989 Blue Pacific, Michael Franks
 1989 Flying Cowboys, Rickie Lee Jones
 1993 Kamakiriad, Donald Fagen
 1994 Mose the Fireman, John Beasley
 2005 All One, Krishna Das
 2005 Tough on Crime, Rebecca Pidgeon
 2009 Baritonality, Roger Rosenberg
 2011 Fra Lippo Lippi'', Fra Lippo Lippi

References

External links

 Companion media website - www.walterbeckermedia.com

 

1950 births
2017 deaths
Stuyvesant High School alumni
Bard College alumni
Record producers from New York (state)
American rock guitarists
American male guitarists
American rock bass guitarists
American male bass guitarists
American male songwriters
American people of British descent
Grammy Award winners
People from Forest Hills, Queens
Deaths from esophageal cancer
Deaths from cancer in New York (state)
Jazz-rock guitarists
20th-century American guitarists
21st-century American guitarists
20th-century American male musicians
21st-century American male musicians